Insulin glulisine is a rapid-acting modified form of medical insulin that differs from human insulin in that the amino acid asparagine at position B3 is replaced by lysine and the lysine in position B29 is replaced by glutamic acid. It was developed by Sanofi-Aventis and approved for marketing by the FDA in 2004; it is sold under the trade name Apidra. When injected subcutaneously, it appears in the blood earlier than human insulin. When used as a meal time insulin, the dose is to be administered within 15 minutes before or 20 minutes after starting a meal. Intravenous injections may also be used for extreme hyperglycemia, but must be performed under the supervision of a medical professional.

The most common side effects include hypoglycaemia (low blood glucose levels).

Medical uses 
Insulin glulisine is indicated for the treatment of diabetes mellitus.

References

External links 
 

Insulin receptor agonists
Insulin therapies
Sanofi